Boris Becker and Slobodan Živojinović were the defending champions.

Becker and Živojinović successfully defended their title, defeating Chip Hooper and Mike Leach 7–6, 7–6 in the final.

Seeds

Draw

Draw

References
Draw

1987 Grand Prix (tennis)
Donnay Indoor Championships